Mount Bolt is a mountain (2,010 m) rising on the north side of Ebbe Glacier and 5 nautical miles (9 km) northwest of Peterson Bluff in the Anare Mountains, a major mountain range situated in the geographical location of Victoria Land, Antarctica. The mountain was first mapped by the United States Geological Survey (USGS) from surveys and U.S. Navy air photos, 1960–63. Named by Advisory Committee on Antarctic Names (US-ACAN) for Lieutenant Ronald L. Bolt, U.S. Navy, pilot of R4D aircraft in the support of the USGS Topo West survey of this area in the 1962–63 season; he also worked the previous austral summer season in Antarctica. The mountain lies situated on the Pennell Coast, a portion of Antarctica lying between Cape Williams and Cape Adare.

See also
Vigil Spur

Mountains of Victoria Land
Pennell Coast